Manolis Stefanakos (born 17 August 1989) is a Greek professional footballer who plays as a goalkeeper for Super League 2 club Doxa Drama.

References

External links
Onsports profile 

1989 births
Living people
Asteras Tripolis F.C. players
Panetolikos F.C. players
Egaleo F.C. players
Ergotelis F.C. players
Super League Greece players
Association football goalkeepers
Footballers from Athens
Greek footballers